Domnall mac Flaíthnia (died 783) was a king of the Uí Failge, a Laigin people of County Offaly. He was the son of Flaithnia mac Flainn (died 755), a previous king. He ruled from 782 to 783. 

His predecessor and uncle Mugrón mac Flainn (died 782) had been slain in battle versus his overlord the King of Leinster. In 783 Domnall was killed in captivity in Cloncurry, County Kildare. The exact circumstances are unknown.

Notes

See also
 Kings of Ui Failghe

References

 Mac Niocaill, Gearoid (1972), Ireland before the Vikings, Dublin: Gill and Macmillan

External links
CELT: Corpus of Electronic Texts at University College Cork

783 deaths
People from County Offaly
8th-century Irish monarchs
Year of birth unknown